Bryan de Hoog (born 29 August 1988) is a Dutch former darts player who played in Professional Darts Corporation (PDC) events.

External links
 http://www.dartsdatabase.co.uk/PlayerDetails.aspx?playerKey=3546

1988 births
Living people
Dutch darts players
Sportspeople from Rotterdam